Policena Hendthi is a 1990 Indian Kannada-language action drama film directed by Om Sai Prakash and produced under Dynamic Film Makers. The film features Shashikumar, Malashri and Devaraj in the lead roles. The film's music was composed by M. Ranga Rao. The film was a remake of the Telugu film Police Bharya.

Plot
This a story of Vanaja (Malashree), a television news reader who provides for her brother Avatari Lokayya (Devaraj) and his wife (Vinaya Prasad). The unemployed brother makes his money by putting on various disguises until he is caught trying to masquerade as a lower-caste person in order to obtain state benefits. He later delivers a speech about the evils anti-caste discrimination laws. Vanaja marries a timid cop (Shashikumar) and transforms him into a real man. She also arranges the cop's sister's marriage while herself getting through a tough civil service examination.

Cast 

 Shashikumar
 Malashri as Vanaja
 Devaraj 
 Vinaya Prasad
 Jai Jagadish
 Tara
 Anjana
 Mukhyamantri Chandru
 M. S. Umesh
 Srinivasa Murthy
 Kaminidharan
 Sudha Narasimharaju
 Bank Janardhan
 Mysore Lokesh

Soundtrack 
The soundtrack of the film was composed by M. Ranga Rao.

References

External links 
 

1990 films
1990 comedy-drama films
1990s Kannada-language films
Indian comedy-drama films
Kannada remakes of Telugu films
Films scored by M. Ranga Rao
Films directed by Sai Prakash